Vanja Rupena (born ) is a Croatian model. She won the 1996 Miss Croatia beauty pageant and represented Croatia in the Miss World 1996 pageant in Bangalore, India.

She appeared on the cover of the Croatian edition of Elle magazine in July 2006, July 2009 and November 2010.

In May 2010 she became host of RTL's reality documentary series Hrvatski Top Model, the Croatian edition of America's Next Top Model.

References

External links
Vanja Rupena at the Fashion Model Directory

1978 births
Living people
People from Koper
Miss World 1996 delegates
Croatian female models
Croatian beauty pageant winners
Slovenian people of Croatian descent